The 1946 accident on the Rampe de Laffrey was the first in a string of fatal accidents along a stretch of road which has been claimed as one of the deadliest in France.  18 people were killed when a bus lost the use of its brakes, flying off the road and into a ravine along the Romanche; the bus was transporting pilgrims from Beaujolais on a return journey from Our Lady of La Salette, where they had been celebrating the Marian Year.  A memorial to the dead was later erected near the town of Saint-Pierre-de-Mésage, close to the accident site.

Ten years later, a similar accident, caused by the same type of malfunction, befell a Dutch tourist bus at the same location, killing seven.

References

1946 road incidents
Road incidents in France
1946 in France
Bus incidents in France
1946 disasters in France